Michael Goldberg may refer to:

Michael Goldberg (painter) (1924–2007), American abstract expressionist painter and teacher
Michael Goldberg (screenwriter) (1959–2014), American screenwriter
Michael Goldberg (writer) (born 1953), American journalist and novelist
Michael Goldberg (sports executive) (1943–2017), executive director of the National Basketball Coaches Association
Michael Goldberg (mathematician) (1902–1990), American mathematician who defined the Goldberg polyhedron
 Mike Goldberg (born 1964), American play-by-play commentator
 Mickey Goldberg (born 1941), American neuroscientist
 M. J. Goldberg, alternative cartoonist